Ernst v Alberta Energy Regulator was a 2017 decision of the Supreme Court of Canada dealing with the extent to which damages are available as a remedy under the Canadian Charter of Rights and Freedoms.

Background
This case pitted Jessica Ernst, an Alberta homeowner, against the Energy Resources Conservation Board (ERCB), who had ceased all forms of communication with her because her offhand remark in an electronic forum referred to Wiebo Ludwig had caused the regulator fear and anxiety over her purported terrorist sympathies. She claimed that her Charter rights to free speech had been abrogated by it, as it refused subsequently to hear her petitions in a dispute over her well-water, which she maintained had been polluted by the fracking activities of EnCana.

In 2007, Ernst sued the Alberta government, EnCana Corporation and the ERCB, for alleged negligence over the contamination of local aquifers during a period of intense and shallow fracking of coal seams near her home in Rosebud, Alberta. It was reported that, between 2003 and 2008, more than 100 Alberta landowners lost or reported damage to their water wells as a result of such activity.

During discussions with the ERCB as early as 2005, the Board identified her as a security threat, and refused any communication with her until she ceased criticizing its actions in public. As a result, she amended her statement of claim to include damages from the ERCB for violating her Charter rights under s. 2(b) thereof.

The ERCB and the Province sought to have certain paragraphs of the claim struck off or, in the alternative, better particulars with respect to such paragraphs. The Board also sought a further alternative of having summary judgment granted in its favour.

The courts below
The Court of Queen's Bench of Alberta ruled that:

Ernst's claims against the ERCB in negligence were struck;
Ernst's Charter claim was valid, subject to the Limitations Act and the Energy Resources Conservation Act; but such claims were barred in any case under the latter Act;
Alberta's application was dismissed.

The Court of Appeal of Alberta dismissed Ernst's appeal, declaring that the lower court's ruling "discloses no reviewable error."

At the Supreme Court
By 5-4, the appeal was dismissed with costs, although for different reasons than were expressed by the Alberta courts.

Cromwell J held that, as Ernst had not successfully challenged the constitutionality of the immunity clause protecting the ERCB, the appeal must fail. However, the constitutional challenge still needed to be considered on its merits:

If an immunity provision clearly purports to bar a damages claim, and if the record before the Court is not adequate to permit a decision on its constitutionality, then the immunity clause must be applied.
Charter damages could never be an appropriate and just remedy for such breaches by the Board, so the immunity clause cannot be unconstitutional. Vancouver (City) v Ward was endorsed, as "Charter damages will not be an appropriate and just remedy where there is an effective alternative remedy or where damages would be contrary to the demands of good governance."
Judicial review would "provide vindication in a much more timely manner than an action for damages", and "there is a wide range of remedies available through judicial review for Charter breaches by quasi-judicial and regulatory boards".
The Board owed Ernst no duty of care under the private law of negligence, "for reasons of insufficient proximity or countervailing policy considerations, or both". In addition, "Opening the Board to damages claims will distract it from its statutory duties, potentially have a chilling effect on its decision making, compromise its impartiality, and open up new and undesirable modes of collateral attack on its decisions."

Abella J was more succinct in explaining why Ernst's claim must fail:

McLachlin CJ, in a joint dissent with Moldave and Brown JJ, would have allowed the appeal, returning the case to the Alberta courts to decide upon the issues relating to free speech and Charter remedies, because:

It was not plain and obvious that Charter damages could not be an appropriate and just remedy. 
It was not plain and obvious that the immunity clause applied to Ernst's claim. 
Therefore, it was unnecessary to answer the constitutional question as to the validity of the immunity clause in the case of a Charter breach.

Notes and references

Notes

References

Further reading 

Supreme Court of Canada cases
2017 in Canadian case law
Alberta case law
Canadian environmental case law
Energy in Alberta
Environment of Alberta
Canadian Charter of Rights and Freedoms case law
Natural gas in Canada
Civil law (common law)